Microdaceton is an African genus of ants in the subfamily Myrmicinae. The genus consists of four species restricted to the Afrotropics. They nest in the leaf litter and seems to be fairly common. However, little is known about their biology.

Species
 Microdaceton exornatum Santschi, 1913
 Microdaceton tanyspinosum Bolton, 2000
 Microdaceton tibialis Weber, 1952
 Microdaceton viriosum Bolton, 2000

References

External links

Myrmicinae
Ant genera
Hymenoptera of Africa
Taxa named by Felix Santschi